Zed "Zeddy" Al Refai (born October 28, 1966) is a Kuwaiti climber. He was the first Arab to climb Mount Everest and the 46th person to climb all seven highest summits in the seven continents of the world.

Biography
Al Refai spent part of his childhood in [usa
] and attended university in the United States, at institutions in Florida, New Jersey, and Pennsylvania. He spent holidays trekking in New England, the Rockies, and the Pacific Northwest. In the mid-1990s he traveled to Nepal, where he was captivated by the Himalayas and Mount Everest. Mountains he has summitted include Mount McKinley in Alaska - North America's highest mountain -, Elbrus, the Carstensz Pyramid in Indonesia, Everest, Kilimanjaro, Mont Blanc, the Vinson Massif in Antarctica, where he reached the summit on January 13, 2004, and, to complete the Seven Summits challenge, Aconcagua in Argentina on February 5, 2004.

Al Refai is director of the Arabian Mountaineering and Alpine Climbing Club, founded in an attempt to popularise mountain climbing among people in the Middle East.

The Seven Summits
 1999: Denali
 2000: Carstensz Pyramid
 2000: Elbrus
 2001: Kilimanjaro
 2003: Everest
 2004: Vinson Massif
 2004: Aconcagua
 2005: Mount Kosciuszko

References

External links
 Al Refai's homepage
 Al Refai's Climbing Center in Kuwait
 Al Refai's Mountaineering Club

1966 births
Living people
Summiters of Mount Everest
Kuwaiti mountain climbers